Oleg Vyacheslavovich Trifonov (born 9 June 1981) is a Russian former professional footballer.

Club career
He made his debut in the Russian Premier League in 2000 for FC Rotor Volgograd. He played 3 games in the UEFA Cup 2005–06 for FC Zenit St. Petersburg.

References

1981 births
Sportspeople from Sochi
Living people
Russian footballers
Russia under-21 international footballers
Association football midfielders
FC Dynamo Stavropol players
FC Rotor Volgograd players
FC Zenit Saint Petersburg players
FC Kuban Krasnodar players
PFC Krylia Sovetov Samara players
FC Volga Nizhny Novgorod players
FC Sokol Saratov players
FC Angusht Nazran players
Russian Premier League players
FC Sportakademklub Moscow players